The Gagini or Gaggini were a family of architects and sculptors, originally from Bissone on Lake Lugano. This family founded Sicily's Gagini school, which flourished until the mid-1600s.

Notable members 
One of the most notable members include Domenico, who founded such school. One of the earliest records of his name involved a contract concluded in 1463, commissioning a monument in the church of the convent of San Francesco, Palermo, for Pietro Speciale. His son, Antonello, is considered the most important of the Gaginis and one of his works was the decorated arch in the Capella della Madonna in Trapani's Santuario dell'Annunziata. He was also known for the decorations of the apse of the Palermo cathedral in 1510 and the statue of St. George and the Dragon with panels inside the Church of San Francesco D'Assisi.

Bibliography 
 Gioacchino Di Marzo, I Gagini e la scultura in Sicilia nei secoli XV e XVI, Palermo 1884

References

External links 
 opere di maestri ticinesi: Domenico Gaggini, Antonello Gaggini, etc.

Italian families
Architects from Sicily
People from Lugano District
Families of Genoa